Ziar may refer to:

People
 Mujawar Ahmad Ziar (born 1937), Afghan historian and linguist
 Rachid Ziar (born 1973), Algerian long-distance runner

Places
 Ziar, Iran (disambiguation), various places in Iran
 Žiar (disambiguation), various places in Slovakia